Gimlet is an unincorporated community in Blaine County in the U.S. state of Idaho.

Gimlet is located in the Wood River Valley along State Highway 75 with Ketchum 5 mi (8 km) north and Hailey 6 mi (9.7 km) south of the community. Gimlet also has the only accessible road to the community of Triumph located 5 mi (8 km) northeast. The Big Wood River flows through Gimlet where it is joined by the East Fork Wood River flowing down from Triumph.

References

Unincorporated communities in Blaine County, Idaho
Unincorporated communities in Idaho